Symphlebia angulifascia is a moth in the subfamily Arctiinae. It was described by Rothschild in 1933. It is found in Bolivia.

References

Moths described in 1933
angulifascia